Fayaz Khan Kheshgi is a Pakistani Pashto musician and Politician. He has also served as union council Nazim. In March 2021, he was awarded Tamgha-i-Imtiaz by Government of Pakistan in recognition of his outstanding achievements in Pashto music.

Awards
 Tamgha-i-Imtiaz (2021)

References

Living people
Recipients of Tamgha-e-Imtiaz
Pakistani musicians
Pakistani male singers
Pashto-language singers
Year of birth missing (living people)